Miriam Zetter (born 14 September 1989) is a Mexican ten-pin bowler.

Zetter competed at the Pan American Games in 2011, where she won a silver medal in the doubles event alongside Sandra Góngora, and in 2019, where she won silver medals in the individual event and in the doubles event alongside Iliana Lomelí.

References

1989 births
Living people
Mexican ten-pin bowling players
Mexican sportswomen
Pan American Games medalists in bowling
Pan American Games silver medalists for Mexico
Bowlers at the 2019 Pan American Games
Bowlers at the 2011 Pan American Games
Medalists at the 2011 Pan American Games
Medalists at the 2019 Pan American Games